Vincent Thomas Sherlock  (March 27, 1910 in Buffalo, New York – May 11, 1997 in Cheektowaga, New York), nicknamed "Baldy", was a former professional baseball player who played second base for the 1935 Brooklyn Dodgers.

Vince was the brother of fellow major leaguer Monk Sherlock, who played with the Philadelphia Phillies.

Although he hit a very effective .462 (11-for-26) with 4 runs and 6 RBI in nine major league games, he was ineffective as a second baseman, committing four errors in 43 total chances for a .907 fielding percentage.

External links

1910 births
1997 deaths
Major League Baseball second basemen
Baseball players from New York (state)
Brooklyn Dodgers players
Tucson Missions players
Mission Reds players
Indianapolis Indians players
Louisville Colonels (minor league) players
Syracuse Chiefs players
Montreal Royals players
Burials in Buffalo, New York